Bladestorm is a fantasy combat board game that was published by Iron Crown Enterprises (ICE) in 1990.

Gameplay
Bladestorm is a fantasy miniatures combat game. The game component was designed by Coleman Charlton, while the sourcebook was designed by Tim Taylor, Peter Fenlon, and John Ruemmler. Interior illustrations were by Michael Hernandez, Sandy Collora, and Ellisa Martin, and cover art was by Angus McBride.

Contents
Bladestorm comes as a boxed set containing:
 64-page rulebook
 160-page sourcebook
 32-page scenario book
 8-page miniature painting manual
 32-page color guidebook
 22" x 17" double-sided color map
 dice

Character generation
Each player must provide a miniature. In the Basic Game this character has attribute ratings for Movement, Melee Attack, Melee Damage, Defense and Endurance.

Combat
If an attacker is within range of an opponent, it can attack using a number of six-sided dice equal to the attacking character's Melee Attack rating; one or more of the dice must exceed the defender's Defense rating in order to inflict damage. Damage is simply equal to the highest die roll that exceeded the defender's Defense rating.

Magic
Most spells in the game are designed for mass combat, and are cast using a spell point system. Wizards with Power Hues can accumulate additional spell points if the sky turns a particular color during combat. The title of the game is taken from one of the most powerful spells, bladestorm, which takes the form of a massive tornado or an expanding ring that inflicts critical damage on friend and foe alike.

Reception
In the February 1992 edition of Dragon (Issue #178), Rick Swan called the game "a remarkable design that not only features an elegant set of game mechanics but a fully developed fantasy world in which to use them." Swan admired the combat system, calling it, "quick and simple, minimizing the need for charts and complicated formulas", and thought that the magic system was "superb". He also liked the Advanced rules, saying that they "build on the concepts introduced in the Basic game, adding interesting twists instead of needless complications."  Swan did think that the game was best designed for small engagements rather than large-scale combats, and advised avoiding the "cumbersome" optional rules. He concluded by giving the game a rating of 4 out of 6, saying, "the Bladestorm game is terrific fun, a stylish integration of clever mechanics and sparkling background material, highlighted by the best mass-combat magic system on the market... Skillfully written, richly detailed, and endlessly replayable, there may be a better self-contained fantasy miniatures game than the Bladestorm rules, but I’ve never seen it."

References

Board games introduced in 1990
Iron Crown Enterprises games